The 2016–17 Albanian Basketball Superleague, was the 51st season of the top professional basketball league in Albania.

Finally, Tirana conquered its 19th title, the first one since 2012.

Clubs and arenas

Overview
In the last round of the regular season, leader Tirana beat Flamurtari, that lost all their matches, by 207–42 establishing a new record in the Albanian league.

Regular season

League table

Playoffs
In the finals, the seeded team played games 1, 3 and 5 (finally not necessary) at home.

References

External links
Albanian Basketball Federation site

Superleague
Albania
Basketball
Basketball